Scrinium blandiatum is an extinct species of sea snail, a marine gastropod mollusk in the family Mitromorphidae.

Description
The length of the shell varies between 7 mm and 8 mm.

Distribution
This extinct marine species is endemic to New Zealand.

References

 Suter, Henry. Descriptions of New Tertiary Mollusca Occurring in New Zealand Part I. 1917.
 Maxwell, P.A. (2009). Cenozoic Mollusca. pp. 232–254 in Gordon, D.P. (ed.) New Zealand inventory of biodiversity. Volume one. Kingdom Animalia: Radiata, Lophotrochozoa, Deuterostomia. Canterbury University Press, Christchurch

External links
 "A.G. Beu and J.I. Raine (2009). Revised descriptions of New Zealand Cenozoic Mollusca from Beu and Maxwell (1990). GNS Science miscellaneous series no. 27." 

blandiatum
Gastropods described in 1917
Gastropods of New Zealand